Tenglong Cave is a cave located  from Lichuan City, Hubei, China. It is believed to be the longest monomer karst cave system in the world. An underground network of streams runs for  whilst the cave is the source of the Qingjiang River. Year round temperatures underground remain in the 16–18 degrees Celsius range.

To facilitate tourist access to the cave, as well as to the so-called Enshi Grand Canyon Scenic Area, the prefectural authorities are considering plans for the construction of a tourist railway, which will link these two popular tourist attractions with a station on the Yichang−Wanzhou Railway (probably, Lichuan).

See also
List of caves in China
List of longest caves

References

External links
Photo gallery of Tenglong Cave

Caves of Hubei
Karst caves
Karst formations of China
Enshi Tujia and Miao Autonomous Prefecture
Tourist attractions in Hubei